The Teushen or Tehues were an indigenous hunter-gatherer people of Patagonia in Argentina. They were considered "foot nomads", whose culture relied on hunting and gathering. Their territory was between the Tehuelche people to the south and the Puelche people to their north.

Before 1850, estimates claimed that there were 500 to 600 Teushen people. They were slaughtered in the Argentinian genocides of Patagonia, known as the Conquest of the Desert. By 1925, only ten to twelve Teushen survived. They are considered extinct as a tribe.

The Teushen language is almost entirely unknown. Linguists believe, from the limited data available, that it was closest to Tehuelche, the language of the people to the south of the Teushen.

See also

Haush
Selknam
Tehuelche

Notes

References
Adelaar, Willen F. H. and Pieter Muysken. The languages of the Andes, Cambridge: Cambridge University Press, 2004. .

Indigenous peoples of the Southern Cone
Indigenous peoples in Argentina
Ethnic groups in Argentina
Hunter-gatherers of South America

Extinct ethnic groups